Benjamin James Gibson (born 15 January 1993) is an English professional footballer who plays as a centre-back for  club Norwich City.

Having graduated from Middlesbrough's Academy, Gibson enjoyed loan spells with Plymouth Argyle, York City and Tranmere Rovers before breaking into the club's first team in 2013. he was part of the Middlesbrough team that secured promotion to the Premier League in 2016 and the following year earned his first call-up to the England national team.

Early and personal life
Gibson was born in Nunthorpe, Cleveland, and attended Nunthorpe School and Yarm School. He is a nephew of Middlesbrough chairman Steve Gibson.

Club career

Middlesbrough
Gibson joined Middlesbrough's Academy from Marton at the age of 12. He was a member of the Middlesbrough team that won the Nike Cup in 2008 and signed his first professional contract with the club on 1 July 2010. He made his first-team debut as a substitute on 25 April 2011 against Coventry City, coming on in the 41st minute for the injured Andrew Davies, with Middlesbrough going on to win the game 2–1. He finished the 2010–11 season with one appearance for Middlesbrough, and having captained the reserve team to The Football Combination East Division title.

Gibson signed a three-month loan deal with League Two club Plymouth Argyle on 2 August 2011. After making 13 appearances in this time, Gibson and both clubs involved agreed on 1 November 2011 to extend the loan deal until 29 January 2012. However, the loan was cut short after Middlesbrough recalled him on 30 November 2011. He signed for Conference Premier club York City on loan until the end of 2011–12 on 9 February 2012. After a promising start Gibson was sent off in the 1–0 away victory to Cambridge United. However, after missing the next four games through suspension he won the 2012 FA Trophy Final with York at Wembley Stadium on 12 May, in which the team beat Newport County 2–0. Eight days later he played in the 2–1 victory over Luton Town in the 2012 Conference Premier play-off Final at Wembley on 20 May 2012, seeing the club return to the Football League after an eight-year absence with promotion to League Two. Gibson completed his loan at York with 11 appearances.

On 14 August 2012, Gibson joined League One club Tranmere Rovers on a one-month loan. The month was extended until January 2013 the following month, but in December 2012 was ruled out of action with an abductor problem, thus ending the duration of his first loan spell at Rovers. He signed a new four-year contract with Middlesbrough on 18 December 2012. On 13 March 2013, Gibson returned on loan to Rovers, until the end of the season.

The 2013–14 season saw Gibson become more involved in the first team squad for Middlesbrough; the team did not perform well, and manager Tony Mowbray was sacked in October 2013. Aitor Karanka replaced him, and they finished twelfth. The following season saw the club finish fourth, qualifying for the play-offs. They reached the final at Wembley Stadium, having won 5–1 on aggregate against Brentford, but were defeated 2–0 by Norwich City. In the 2015–16 season, Gibson helped Middlesbrough secure promotion to the Premier League, having finished as runners-up in the Championship.

Gibson still remained as a crucial part of Middlesbrough's squad in their 2016–17 Premier League campaign, though they did not record positive results; they dropped into relegation zone in March 2017, with Karanka being sacked later that month. Their relegation back to the Championship was confirmed in May 2017, after a 3–0 defeat to champions Chelsea, with the club having only been in the English top flight for one season.

Burnley
Gibson signed for Premier League club Burnley on 5 August 2018 on a four-year contract for a joint club-record fee of £15 million. He made his debut on 16 August in a 1–0 win over İstanbul Başakşehir in a UEFA Europa League third qualifying round second leg match. Gibson then appeared in their next Europa League fixture the following week, a 3–1 defeat to Olympiacos, in which he was sent off for a second bookable offence. He made his Premier League debut for the club on 26 December, in which he scored Burnley's only goal of the match, which was a 5–1 defeat to Everton.

Gibson made just one appearance during the 2019–20 season, starting in a 3–1 loss to Sunderland in the third round of the EFL Cup. In February 2020, Gibson was permitted by the club to train with former club Middlesbrough after informing the club his desire to leave in January.

Norwich City
Gibson returned to the Championship on 4 September 2020, signing for newly relegated team Norwich City on a season-long loan, with the transfer becoming permanent if Norwich were to achieve promotion back to the Premier League that season. He made his debut on 3 October in a 1–0 defeat to Derby County. Gibson was a member of the Norwich team that won the Championship title, achieving promotion back up to the Premier League at the first time of asking.

Gibson signed for Norwich permanently on 1 July 2021 on a three-year contract for an undisclosed fee, reported by the Lancashire Telegraph to be £8 million.

International career
Gibson has competed for the England under-17s, the under-18s, the under-20s and the under-21s. He was part of the under-17 teams that won the 2009 Nordic Cup, where he scored in the final against Scotland, and the 2010 UEFA European Under-17 Championship.

Gibson made his debut for England under-21s in the first leg of the 2015 UEFA European Under-21 Championship qualification play-offs against Croatia on the back of an impressive campaign for Middlesbrough. His performances made him a key member of the under-21 set up and he formed an effective partnership with John Stones. Gibson scored his first goal for the under-21s in England's final friendly before the European Championships against Belarus. He went on to play 90 minutes in all of England's three group stage matches in the tournament although could not stop their disappointing early departure.

Gibson received his first call-up to the England national team on 24 March 2017, replacing the injured Chris Smalling for the 2018 FIFA World Cup qualifier against Lithuania.

Career statistics

Honours
York City
FA Trophy: 2011–12
Conference Premier play-offs: 2012

Norwich City
EFL Championship: 2020–21

England U17
UEFA European Under-17 Championship: 2010

References

External links

Profile at the Norwich City F.C. website

1993 births
Living people
People from Nunthorpe
Footballers from North Yorkshire
English footballers
England youth international footballers
England under-21 international footballers
Association football defenders
Middlesbrough F.C. players
Plymouth Argyle F.C. players
York City F.C. players
Tranmere Rovers F.C. players
Burnley F.C. players
Norwich City F.C. players
English Football League players
National League (English football) players
Premier League players
People educated at Yarm School